Cibao International Airport , also known as Santiago Airport, is located in Santiago de los Caballeros, Dominican Republic's second-largest city. It is the country's third-busiest airport by passenger traffic and aircraft movements, after Punta Cana International Airport and Las Américas International Airport. Since its inauguration, Cibao International has been projected to become one of busiest airports in terms of passenger traffic in the country. Presently it has become the third-busiest airport in the Dominican Republic, only being surpassed by the airports of Punta Cana and Santo Domingo. The airport served more than 970,000 passengers in 2006.

The air terminal mainly serves Dominicans residing in the United States, the Turks and Caicos Islands, and Puerto Rico, as well as Haitians residing in the Cibao Region. Recently many tourists and missionary workers are using Cibao Int'l as a gateway to the Dominican Republic.

JetBlue is the primary international operator, with up to twenty daily flights to New York–JFK, Newark, and Boston. The airline replaced flights from American Airlines, and some slots from other airlines flying to the United States of America.

History 
Plans for the construction of the airport were first proposed in 1969. The Cibao International Airport Corporation was created on March 29, 1978 with the cooperation of José Armando Bermúdez (president), Víctor Espaillat, Manuel Arsenio Ureña, Dr. José Augusto Imbert, Mario Cáceres and Ing. Carlos S. Fondeur, who acquired the land necessary to build the new airport.

The construction of the airport began on February 15, 2000 and was finished in 2002. The airport was inaugurated on March 18, 2002 with two direct flights to San Juan operated by American Eagle.

In May 2002 Aeromar Líneas Aéreas Dominicanas made the first direct flight from Santiago to JFK Airport in New York. Later that month American Airlines and North American Airlines began direct flights to New York, Miami, and San Juan. A few months later Continental Airlines began direct flights from Newark. This was followed by direct service by JetBlue Airways and Delta Air Lines, both from New York.
Aeromar became Santiago as it secondary hub, after Las Américas International Airport.

In 2003 Aeromar Líneas Aéreas Dominicanas stopped their flights into Santiago after the airline stopped operations.

By the end of 2005 the airport's operator began one of the biggest expansions for this airport. They expanded the custom hall and rebuilt the west and east side of the terminal. The terminal saw the addition of a second floor. This expansion was finalized in 2006. The runway's  expansion is currently in folders, but there is no scheduled date to begin or conclude this expansion yet.

In April 2008, Cibao International became the first airport in the country to exonerate fees for private planes, making it possible to increase tourism in the region.

In June, 2008, Continental Airlines announced the discontinuation of their services to Santiago until September 3.
Delta Air Lines announced the new service to Atlanta, starting on December 20, 2008 and the resuming of the New York route on December 13, 2008.

On January 9, 2009, Spirit Airlines announced operations to Santiago from Fort Lauderdale, Florida, starting on June 21, 2009.

In 2010 the airport recovered passengers movement from last year, handling more than 900,000. It also became the third-busiest airport by passengers in the country, been already ranked number three in aircraft operations. In this year were established also regular domestics routes from Santiago operated by Aerolineas Mas, Air Century, Caribair and VolAir. Aerolineas Mas became the strongest domestic airline in the airport and started operating Santiago's Airport as a Focus City-Destination.

March 14, 2011 Aerolíneas Mas, Air Century, Vol Air and Caribair all cancelled their domestic flights. The domestic terminal was then used for private charter flights.

On April 1, 2013 American Airlines stopped their direct flight to New York's JFK Airport.

December 2019, there were plans by Frontier Airlines to operate flights to Newark, New Jersey to Santiago. However, their plans to operate the EWR-STI route were canceled due to airport restrictions. That route was successful, however, as JetBlue was operating direct flights on the EWR-STI route as of October 2022.

Up until January 2020, the airport operated on private land which wasn't paid to the original owners; the current administration was plagued with multiple lawsuits, with the lower courts siding with the land owners. The case is currently in the Supreme Court.

Infrastructure 
The Cibao International Airport infrastructure consists of the main international terminal, domestic terminal and a cargo terminal.
The international terminal is the most utilized and receives most of the flights operating in here and it has modern installations to make easier the check-in, boarding and baggage claim processes.

The airport's owners are planning to expand the runway and the construction of the new taxiway next to the runway by the next year.

Runway and taxiways 
Runway 11/29

The runway length is 2,620 m, which can support all types of passenger airliners. The airport's operators are discussing the expansion of the runway to allow larger aircraft for long-haul flights from Europe.

Taxiways

Cibao International Airport's taxiways are composed by two exits E-1 and E-2; E-1 is located on the west side of Runway 11/29, next to the direction 11 of that runway. E-2 is located in the east side of the runway, next to direction 29 of the runway.

Runway lighting

Airport expansion

The Cibao International Airport is currently under renovation. The works include the extension of the aircraft movement and parking platform, amplification of the runway by about 380 meters to accommodate aircraft with greater capacity and range. In addition, it announced important improvements to the passenger terminal, enhancing its comfort and capacity, including new access roads. The Cibao International Airport technical team estimates that the renovation process will be finished in 2026. 

The design work was carried out by Luis Vidal + Architects, and it will be built under the direction of the Airport's technical team. In the remodeling, 300 million dollars will be invested with the aim of doubling the capacity of the terminal, from where two million people are transferred each year. In addition, it will serve as cargo transport to more than 25 million pounds annually.

This new terminal will have sufficient capacity to meet current and future demand over the next twenty years, offering an optimum level of service for all its users.

Terminals

International terminal 
The airport's main terminal (international) has six gates (B1-B6). Five of these gates provide boarding docks (B1-B2/B4-B6). It is located between the domestic terminal and the cargo terminal. It has all of the facilities of a modern airport.

Future expansion of this airport is being discussed which would include additional gates and baggage handling areas as well as expanding the taxiway. Recently gates B1 and B2 received boarding docks leaving gate B3 for smaller aircraft. JetBlue Airways is currently the largest carrier at the airport.

Domestic terminal 
The airport's domestic terminal, also called the General Aviation hall, has three stands (A1 to A3), and is located next to the international terminal. It was used for domestic flights and is now used for charter private flights. Aerolineas Mas was currently the major domestic airline in this Airport. The airline operated flights to Santo Domingo-JBQ and Port-au-Prince, and with plans to operate regularly to Punta Cana, Aerolineas Mas had made of this airport its Focus City. Air Century ceased operations on regular domestic flights from/to Santo Domingo-JBQ, Punta Cana and Puerto Plata, operating all their flights through the Domestic Terminal. All domestic flights are no longer available at this Dominican airport. The international air terminal is the only terminal in use.

Military 
This airport also served as the northern air base for the Dominican Air Force, however, mainly as a support facility. Presently there are no military aircraft stationed at this airport.

Airlines and destinations

Passenger

Cargo

Statistics

Passenger traffic

Top International Routes

Incidents and accidents 

February 7, 2008, A Caribair flight crashed close to La Romana, when its engines stopped. There were no fatalities, but the pilot had some injuries. The aircraft was a Britten Norman Islander BN-2A, registered as HI-653CA, and had departed on a flight to Punta Cana International Airport via La Romana International Airport at 6 pm.

See also 
List of the busiest airports in Dominican Republic
List of the busiest airports in the Caribbean

References

External links
  Cibao International Airport website 
 Live Tracker MDST
 Aerial View Tracker MDST
 Video of Cibao Intl Aircraft movements
 Picture of CO Boeing 777 in STI Note: link this picture to others of the same airport
 Aeropuerto Cibao - Departamento Aeroportuario
 Airport Data for STI
 Dominican Republic Search Engine
 Fly Dominican Republic/Dominican Republic Pilots Guide
 Weather Information at NOAA

Airports in the Dominican Republic
Buildings and structures in Santiago Province (Dominican Republic)
Santiago de los Caballeros